The D'Yves Yvasion 2000 is a family of French paramotors that was designed by Yves Hélary and produced by D'Yves Air Pub of La Chapelle-en-Vexin for powered paragliding. Now out of production, when it was available the aircraft was supplied complete and ready-to-fly.

Design and development
The Yvasion 2000 series was designed to comply with the US FAR 103 Ultralight Vehicles rules as well as European regulations. It features a paraglider-style wing, single-place accommodation and a single engine in pusher configuration with a reduction drive and a two-bladed wooden propeller. The individual models differ by the installed powerplant.

As is the case with all paramotors, take-off and landing is accomplished by foot. Inflight steering is accomplished via handles that actuate the canopy brakes, creating roll and yaw.

Variants
Yvasion 2000 F
Model with a  Fly 130 engine in pusher configuration with a 3.3:1 ratio reduction drive and a  diameter two-bladed wooden propeller.
Yvasion 2000 J1
Model with a  JPX D160 engine in pusher configuration with a 2.8:1 ratio reduction drive and a  diameter two-bladed wooden propeller.
Yvasion 2000 J3
Model with a  JPX D330 engine in pusher configuration with a 2.8:1 ratio reduction drive and a  diameter two-bladed wooden propeller.
Yvasion 2000 R
Model with a  RDM 100 engine in pusher configuration with a 3.8:1 ratio reduction drive and a  diameter two-bladed wooden propeller.
Yvasion 2000 S
Model with a  Solo 210 engine in pusher configuration with a 2.8:1 ratio reduction drive and a  diameter two-bladed wooden propeller.

Specifications (Yvasion 2000 S)

References

Yvasion 2000
2000s French ultralight aircraft
Single-engined pusher aircraft
Paramotors